Colfax (formerly Alden Grove, Alder Grove, Illinoistown, and Upper Corral) is a city in Placer County, California, at the crossroads of Interstate 80 and State Route 174.  The population was 1,963 at the 2010 census.  The town is named in honor of U.S. Vice President Schuyler Colfax (1869–73), a bronze statue of whom stands at Railroad Street and Grass Valley Street. (This is the only known statue of Schuyler Colfax in the United States.)

Some of the town's notable features include the newly restored Southern Pacific Railroad colonnade-style depot (which houses the Colfax Museum and Chamber of Commerce) built in 1905, the downtown shops on Main Street, and Colfax High School, which serves a large surrounding area.

History
Originally inhabited by the Maidu and Miwok Native Americans, by the mid-19th century the city site was known as Alder Grove; however, as development increased, the city became known as Illinoistown, a supply hub for gold mining camps. In April 1852, the Reelfoot Williams Gang robbed a Nevada City stagecoach of $7,000 in gold bullion near Illinoistown. This was the first stagecoach robbery in the gold country.

Later it was renamed Colfax after then Speaker of the House (and later Vice President) Schuyler Colfax who visited the town in 1865 while inspecting progress of construction of the Central Pacific Railroad, the western portion of the first transcontinental railroad. The city was the southern terminus of the Nevada County Narrow Gauge Railroad from 1876 until the railroad's removal in 1942. Historic U.S. Route 40 also runs through the city as well as the more modern Interstate 80.  The city is mentioned in Jules Verne’s book, Around the World in Eighty Days.

In July 2015 the Lowell Fire burned thousands of acres nearby, forcing evacuation in Nevada County.

On August 4, 2021 the River Fire started in the Bear River Campground, forcing thousands of residents on both the Placer and Nevada county sides of the river to evacuate.

Geography
Colfax is located at  (39.097260, −120.954017).

The principal geologic structures present are granitic and metamorphic rock formations. The fault runs through the old grammar school baseball field so they closed the school. No movement has been recorded by the U.S. Geological Survey, and the faults are considered inactive. Bunch Creek is an active water source flowing south to eventually reach a confluence with the North Fork of the American River.

Colfax sits a few miles outside the Tahoe National Forest as I-80 begins its climb into the Sierras. Because of its location it is considered at high risk of wildfire.

Climate
Colfax has a hot-summer Mediterranean climate (Köppen Csa) that is characterized by cool, wet winters and hot, dry summers. Summers can be quite hot, especially in the months of July and August where temperatures easily reach , with plenty of sunshine.

Demographics

The 2010 United States Census reported that Colfax had a population of 1,963. The racial makeup of Colfax was 1,759 (89.6%) White, 4 (0.2%) African American, 26 (1.3%) Native American, 29 (1.5%) Asian, 2 (0.1%) Pacific Islander, 54 (2.8%) from other races, and 89 (4.5%) from two or more races. Hispanic or Latino of any race were 178 persons (9.1%).

The Census reported that 1,958 people (99.7% of the population) lived in households, 5 (0.3%) lived in non-institutionalized group quarters, and 0 (0%) were institutionalized.

There were 823 households, out of which 286 (34.8%) had children under the age of 18 living in them, 334 (40.6%) were opposite-sex married couples living together, 131 (15.9%) had a female householder with no husband present, 40 (4.9%) had a male householder with no wife present.  There were 67 (8.1%) unmarried opposite-sex partnerships, and 3 (0.4%) same-sex married couples or partnerships, while 259 households (31.5%) were made up of individuals, and 90 (10.9%) had someone living alone who was 65 years of age or older. The average household size was 2.38.  There were 505 families (61.4% of all households); the average family size was 2.98.

The population was spread out, with 499 people (25.4%) under the age of 18, 159 people (8.1%) aged 18 to 24, 501 people (25.5%) aged 25 to 44, 580 people (29.5%) aged 45 to 64, and 224 people (11.4%) who were 65 years of age or older.  The median age was 37.9 years. For every 100 females, there were 92.3 males.  For every 100 females age 18 and over, there were 86.3 males.

The homeowner vacancy rate was 4.0%; the rental vacancy rate was 12.5%; 895 people (45.6% of the population) lived in owner-occupied housing units and 1,063 people (54.2%) lived in rental housing units.

Transportation 
Amtrak, the national passenger rail system, provides service to Colfax. The city's passenger rail station is located at 99 Railroad Street in the heart of town. Amtrak Train 5, the westbound California Zephyr, is scheduled to depart Colfax at 11:48 a.m. daily with service to Roseville, Sacramento, Davis, Martinez, and Emeryville across the bay from San Francisco.  Amtrak Train 6, the eastbound California Zephyr, is scheduled to depart Colfax at 12:21 p.m. daily with service to Truckee, Reno, Sparks, Winnemucca, Elko, Salt Lake City, Provo, Helper, Green River, Grand Junction, Glenwood Springs, Denver, Omaha, Galesburg, and Chicago. A bronze statue of the town's namesake, Schuyler Colfax, stands near the depot at the Grass Valley Street railroad grade crossing.

References

 Colfax, California community profile
 Earth Metrics Inc., "Phase I Environmental Site Assessment, Bunch Creek Shopping Center, Colfax, California", printed in San Mateo, Ca., Document File no. 7928W0, May 16, 1989

Further reading
 Moody, C. L. (1917). The breccias of the Mariposa formation in the vicinity of Colfax, California. University of California publications, v. 10, no. 21. Berkeley, CA: University of California Press. .
 Du Vall, A. H., & Landrith, M. H. (1984). A Colfax cemetery recording: Colfax, California, 29 February 1984. Auburn, CA: The Authors. .

External links

 City of Colfax
 Colfax Area Chamber of Commerce
 Colfax History

 
1910 establishments in California
Cities in Placer County, California
Cities in Sacramento metropolitan area
Incorporated cities and towns in California
Populated places established in 1910
Populated places in the Sierra Nevada (United States)